KCIB-LD, virtual channel 5 (UHF digital channel 21), is a low-powered Walk TVaffiliated television station licensed to El Dorado, Arkansas, United States. The station is owned by the Immanuel Baptist Church.

Digital channels
The station's digital signal is multiplexed:

References

External links
Station website
Immanuel Baptist Church

CIB-LD
Television channels and stations established in 1995
Low-power television stations in the United States
El Dorado, Arkansas